Pain Mesa is a large mesa just north of Tobin Mesa in the Mesa Range, Victoria Land. Named by the northern party of New Zealand Geological Survey Antarctic Expedition (NZGSAE), 1962–63, for Kevin Pain, deputy leader of this party.

Mesas of Antarctica
Landforms of Victoria Land
Pennell Coast